Al-Nabi Rubin (transliteration: an-Nabî Rûbîn) was a Palestinian village in central Palestine region, what is now Israel, located  west of Ramla, just northeast of Yibna and  south of Jaffa. Nabi Rubin is named after a shrine in the village, believed by Muslims to be the tomb of Reuben, first son of Jacob. It was captured by the Israel Defense Forces during the 1948 Arab-Israeli War, and the inhabitants were expelled.

History
Walid Khalidi writes that it is believed that the shrine for al-Nabi Rubin was built in the same place where a Canaanite temple had once stood, and that the mawsim ("religious festival") itself was pagan in origin.

Nabi Rubin was a place of trade between Crusaders and Muslims prior to it being inhabited. In 1184, it held a fair where Arab merchants from Damascus traded slaves, Persian and Kurdish-bred horses, weapons, and blades from Yemen and India, with Christians from Acre. This trade continued until wars between the Mamluks and Crusaders commenced in the 13th century.

Mamluk era
The Nabi Rubin mawsim was one of two prominent mawsims for Old Testament prophets in Palestine—the other being dedicated to Nabi Musa ("the prophet Moses") near Jericho.

The site comprised a mosque, a minaret, (now demolished), and a maqam, as well as at least nine wells dispersed in the sand dunes nearby. The oldest part of the present structure is the maqam, which, according to an inscription, was built under the orders of the governor of Gaza; Timraz al-Mu'ayyadi between 1436 and 1437 C.E.

Islamic judge Mujir ad-Din wrote in 1495 it "is a tomb of our Reuben," thereon crystallizing in local Muslim tradition that the site is the burial place of Reuben, son of Jacob and Leah. Despite popular belief, the tomb may possibly be that of an Arab sheikh. Already this year, 1495, Mujir al-Din mentioned it as a place of pilgrimage.

Ottoman era
A cross-vaulted room to the east was built slightly later, possibly in the 16th century. The rest of the complex was built in the later Ottoman period, probably in the 19th century.

Since at least the 17th century, Muslims from Jaffa, Ramla, Lydda, and the towns and villages surrounding these cities, flocked to Nabi Rubin to celebrate the mawsim.

In 1816, an English traveler, Charles Leonard Irby, visited the "Sheik Rubin´s tomb, surrounded by a square wall, inclosing some trees". He also describes that [local] people paid vows at the shrine and celebrated festivals there.

In 1863, Victor Guérin noted: "A square enclosure encloses a courtyard planted with about ten old mulberries, which form, in this desert and sandy place, a kind of small oasis.   Cisterns provide water for those who come to venerate the memory of Neby Roubin.  This person, according to a Moslem tradition, was none other than the patriarch Reuben, the eldest of the twelve sons of Jacob. It rests at the bottom of the courtyard under a cupola which rises above a large  sarcophagus covered with a carpet. Another tradition, on the contrary, is that this pretended prophet is simply a sheikh who lived in the course of the last century. At any rate, at the feast of Neby Roubin, a crowd of Muslims hastened on pilgrimage to this place, and this solitary koubbeh becomes the rendezvous of a multitude of more or less considerable pious visitors."

The village of Nabi Rubin was first settled by members of the Abu Sawayrih tribe who are descendants of the al-Maliha Bedouin tribe who used dwell in the Sinai Peninsula.

An Ottoman village list of about 1870 showed that Nabi Rubin had 44 houses and a population of 109, though the population count included only men. It also noted that there was a  tomb there, and that it was a pilgrimage site.

However, when Clermont-Ganneau visited in 1873–4, he found the place "utterly deserted." In 1881, he had "the good fortune" to be present at the festival, and observed "the very curious ceremonies connected to them."

British Mandate era

In the 1922 census of Palestine, conducted by the British Mandate authorities, Nabi Rubin, tribal area  had a population of 120, all  Muslims.

In 1933, during the Nabi Rubin celebrations, Arabs went on strike and rioted against British Mandatory rule. The first Palestinian film, a 1935 documentary, was also presented at the Nabi Rubin festivals. Up to 30,000 people made the pilgrimage annually throughout the month of August.  
Temporary coffeehouses, restaurants, and stalls selling food and other merchandise were set up, and people sang popular songs, — both religious and nationalist — and danced the traditional dabka. Sufi dervishes held dhikr sessions, and pilgrims also watched horse races, magic shows and listened to sermons from imams and poets. City wives, who virtually never socialized outside households, in particular "craved participation in the festival," and Tawfiq Canaan writes that they would announce to their husbands "Either you take me to Nabi Rubin, or you divorce me."

The writer S. Yizhar, who as a child sneaked over the sands from his home in Rehovot, later described: "One finally arrives at Nabi Rubin and its mosque in the center, to watch by the light of bonfires...or even electricity from portable generators, the performance of the dances, the whirling of the dervishes, the colorful candy wrappers,...the pot-bellied swaying Gypsy woman  ....while on the side, the singing keeps sawing away all time, not ceasing until the depths of night..."

The village's land area, most of which was covered by sand dunes, was the second largest in the district after that of Yibna, and was designated as an Islamic waqf ("pious endowment"). Some of the houses, which were scattered across the site without any discernible nucleus, were also built inside the fruit orchards. Shops, as well as a movie theater, were built in the neighborhood of the shrine. The villagers worked in agriculture and animal husbandry; they also catered to the visitors during the mawsim. They cultivated mainly grain, followed by citrus and other fruits, such as figs and grapes.

In the 1945 statistics  the population was 1,420, all Muslims,  while the total land area was 31,002  dunams, according to an official land and population survey. Of this, a total of 683 dunums was devoted to citrus and banana cultivation,  4357 dunums were allocated to cereals, 184 dunums were irrigated or used for orchards, while 25,770 dunams were classified as non-cultivable land.

In 1946, a boys' school was started, with an enrollment of 56 pupils.

After the Establishment of Israel

Nabi Rubin was located in a region which was targeted by Haganah's "Operation Lightning" (Mivtza Barak) during the 1948 Arab–Israeli War, which aimed to force the Arab inhabitants to move. During the 10–12 May 1948, units of the Ephraim sub-district, apparently without success, repeatedly mortared and raided Nabi Rubin, with the aim of forcing evacuation.

On June 1, 1948, Israel's Giv'ati Brigade captured the village in the second stage of Operation Barak. Upon its capture, most of its inhabitants were expelled, except for a few who stayed until the harvest season to collect oranges, but they too were later expelled. On the 24 August, the Giv'ati Brigade HQ issued the order for Mivtza Nikayon (Operation Cleaning), aiming at 'cleansing' [letaher] the newly conquered area which included Nabi Rubin. Any armed units were to be destroyed, and any Arab civilians expelled. The operation took place on 28 August, and they "killed 10 Arabs, wounded three and captured 3". There were no IDF casualties.

According to Salman Abu-Sitta, in 1998, there were 10,116 Palestinian refugees from Nabi Rubin or their descendants.

In 1992 Walid Khalidi described Nabi Rubin: The shrine of al-Nabi Rubin stands amid shrubs and other wild vegetation. A minaret that has three lancet-arched entrances stands at one end of it. A number of minor shrines built of large stones also remain. Near the shrine is a deserted, free-standing cement structure that consists of a single, box-shaped room.

The shrine of Reuben remained abandoned by most of the 20th century and deteriorated gradually; by 1991, the minaret of the mosque was torn down, as were centuries-old mulberry trees that had been located in the courtyard. Eventually, the shrine was reconsecrated as a Jewish holy site. In 2000, the green curtain with the Arabic inscription "There is no god but God, and Rubin is his prophet" which had been laid on the tomb was replaced by a red one with a quotation in Hebrew from Genesis 49:3, "Reuben, thou art my firstborn, my might, and the beginning of my strength".

See also
Depopulated Palestinian locations in Israel
List of villages depopulated during the Arab–Israeli conflict
Nabi Musa
Nabi Salih

References

Bibliography

  
 
 

 
  

 
 

 

    p. 217

External links
Welcome To al-Nabi Rubin
al-Nabi Rubin (Ramla), Zochrot
Survey of Western Palestine, Map 13: IAA,  Wikimedia commons 
al-Nabi Rubin, at Khalil Sakakini Cultural Center

History of Palestine (region)
Islamic holy places
Arab villages depopulated during the 1948 Arab–Israeli War
District of Ramla
Islamic shrines in Israel
Ruben